Nicolai Søberg Poulsen (born 15 August 1993) is a Danish professional footballer who plays as a midfielder for AGF in the Danish Superliga.

Club career

Randers FC
Having progressed through the club's youth system Poulsen made his first team debut in the 2012-13 season ending up with a total of nine appearances.

Poulsen soon established himself as a first team regular forming central midfield with Randers-captain Christian Keller in the 2014-15 season.

AGF
On 3 June 2019, Poulsen joined AGF for the 2019–20 season.

International career
In the autumn of 2014, Poulsen made his debut for the Denmark national under-21 football team in a friendly match against the Czech Republic.

On 30 July 2016, Poulsen was selected for the Denmark Olympic national team that was to participate in the 2016 Summer Olympics. However, in a Danish Superliga match against AGF the next day, Poulsen suffered a broken jaw in a head-to-head duel with his former teammate, AGF's Mustafa Amini and was therefore forced to stay at home.

References

External links
 Nicolai Poulsen at Superstats.dk
 

1993 births
Living people
Danish men's footballers
Randers FC players
Sarpsborg 08 FF players
Aarhus Gymnastikforening players
Danish Superliga players
Eliteserien players
Danish expatriate men's footballers
Expatriate footballers in Norway
Association football midfielders
People from Randers
Danish expatriate sportspeople in Norway
Denmark under-21 international footballers
Sportspeople from the Central Denmark Region